Silver Lake is a  circular lake southwest of Avon Park, Florida.  It is on the west end of Bill Sachsenmeier Memorial Road.  The only access to it is within the Reflection on Silver Lake retirement mobile home and RV park.  There is no public access to the lake.  It has a private fishing dock, but no boat dock.  The lake's shore is pretty much inaccessible, due to tall grass surrounding the entire lake.

References

Lakes of Highlands County, Florida
Lakes of Florida